Leptospermum rupicola is a low-growing shrub that is endemic to New South Wales where it grows near cliffs. It has thin, rough bark, narrow lance-shaped leaves, white flowers and relatively large fruit that remain on the plant at maturity.

Description
Leptospermum rupicola is a low-growing shrub that typically grows to a height  or less. It has thin, firm bark, the younger stems with flattened hairs at first and a conspicuous flange. There are a few reddish-brown bracts at the base of the young flower buds but they are soon shed. Flowering mainly occurs from March to May and from September to October. The fruit is a capsule  in diameter, the sepals having fallen off, and that remains on the plant when mature.

Taxonomy and naming
Leptospermum rupicola was first formally described in 1989 by Joy Thompson in the journal Telopea, based on plant material collected by Ernest Constable at Nellie's Glen near Blackheath in 1957. The species is named for its habitat.

Distribution and habitat
This tea-tree grows in shrubby communities near high sandstone cliffs in central-eastern New South Wales. A group of about a dozen plants survive in an abandoned railway cutting at Lawson in the Blue Mountains  of New South Wales. This being the most eastern end of its distribution in the Blue Mountains.

References

rupicola
Myrtales of Australia
Flora of New South Wales
Plants described in 1989
Taxa named by Joy Thompson